Lord Henry FitzGerald PC (Ire) (30 July 1761 – 9 July 1829) was the fourth son of the 1st Duke of Leinster and the Duchess of Leinster (née Lady Emily Lennox). A younger brother was the revolutionary Lord Edward FitzGerald.

Life
Fitzgerald joined the British Army and became a lieutenant in the 66th Foot in 1788, transferring as a captain in 1779 to the newly raised 85th Foot, which was posted to garrison duty in Jamaica for the duration the American Revolutionary War. He was there promoted to major in 1781 and lieutenant-colonel in 1783, taking over command of the regiment from General Charles Stanhope, 3rd Earl of Harrington. After the 85th was disbanded in 1783 he became a captain and lieutenant-colonel in the 2nd Foot Guards in 1789 and retired from active service in 1792.

He was a Member of Parliament (MP) for Kildare Borough between 1776 and 1783 and represented then Athy between 1790 and 1791. From 1790 to 1798, he sat in the Irish House of Commons for Dublin City. On 8 July 1806, he was appointed to the Privy Council of Ireland, and from 1807 until 1814, Lord Henry served in the Parliament of the United Kingdom for Kildare. He also held the position of one of the joint Postmasters General of Ireland from April 1806 until May 1807.

He was a member of the Kildare Street Club in Dublin and died at Boyle Farm, Thames Ditton, on 9 July 1829.

Family
He married Charlotte Boyle Walsingham in London on 3/4 August 1791. Together they lived at Boyle Farm, Thames Ditton. The couple had twelve children (Note: List below contains 13 Children); his issue took the surname FitzGerald-de Ros:

Henry William FitzGerald-de Ros, 22nd Baron de Ros (1792–1839)
Lt. Col. Arthur John Hill FitzGerald-de Ros (21 December 1793 – 23 February 1826)
Hon. Emily FitzGerald-de Ros (1795-d.y.)
General William Lennox Lascelles FitzGerald-de Ros, 23rd Baron de Ros (1797–1874)
Edmund Emilius Boyle FitzGerald-de Ros (4 May 1799 – 12 September 1810)
Charlotte FitzGerald-de Ros (1801-1813)
Henrietta Mabel FitzGerald-de Ros (1802-22 December 1879), married on 24 October 1828 John Broadhurst of Foston Hall (d. 1861)
RAdm. John Frederick FitzGerald-de Ros (6 March 1804 – 19 June 1861)
Augustus FitzGerald-de Ros (b. 1805), died young
Olivia Cecilia FitzGerald-de Ros (11 January 1807 – London, 21 April 1885), married on 22/23 October 1833 Henry Wellesley, 1st Earl Cowley
Geraldine FitzGerald-de Ros (1809-28 September 1881), married on 25 November 1830 The Rev. Frederic Pare
Cecilia FitzGerald-de Ros (1811- 6 October 1869), married on 10 December 1835 The Hon. John Boyle (13 March 1803 – 6 December 1874), son of Edmund Boyle, 8th Earl of Cork and had issue
Jane FitzGerald-de Ros (1813-1885), married Christopher Hamilton, and had issue

References

 
 FitzGerald genealogy
 Peerage.com
 

1761 births
1829 deaths
Irish MPs 1776–1783
Irish MPs 1790–1797
Members of the Privy Council of Ireland
Members of the Parliament of the United Kingdom for County Kildare constituencies (1801–1922)
People from Thames Ditton
UK MPs 1807–1812
UK MPs 1812–1818
Younger sons of dukes
Henry
People from County Kildare
19th-century Irish people
Members of the Parliament of Ireland (pre-1801) for County Kildare constituencies
Members of the Parliament of Ireland (pre-1801) for County Dublin constituencies